Anthony Harris (born December 24, 1981) is a former American football defensive tackle. He was signed by the Rock River Raptors as a street free agent in 2005. He played college football at Mississippi Delta Community College, Northwestern Oklahoma State University and  Western New Mexico University.

He was also a member of the California Redwoods.

External links
Just Sports Stats
Milwaukee Iron bio
New York Jets bio
Western New Mexico Mustangs bio

1981 births
Living people
Players of American football from Mississippi
American football defensive ends
American football defensive tackles
American football long snappers
Mississippi Delta Trojans football players
Northwestern Oklahoma State Rangers football players
Western New Mexico Mustangs football players
Carolina Panthers players
Milwaukee Iron players
Miami Dolphins players
Sacramento Mountain Lions players
Chicago Slaughter players
Allen Wranglers players
Nebraska Danger players
People from Mayersville, Mississippi